Orto-Tokoy is an urban-type settlement in the Issyk-Kul Region of Kyrgyzstan, just north of the A365 highway between Kochkor and Balykchy. Its population was 491 in 2021. Administratively, it is part of the city of Balykchy. It is on the east-flowing part of the upper river Chu, downsteam from the Orto-Tokoy Reservoir and dam.

Population

References

Populated places in Issyk-Kul Region